Montpelier is a small village in Saint Philip Parish, Antigua and Barbuda.

History

Montpelier Sugar Factory 
Montpelier Estate, (c.1890 to 1954) was one of three sugar factories in Antigua and was known for its muscovado sugar. It had a buff hose located on a hill near the village of Saint Philips, having a view of the Montpelier estate and surrounding fields. 

In the 1890s, it was considered one of the premier muscovado sugar factories in the entire Caribbean.

It was first owned by Capt. William Harman RN.

Demographics

2001 Census 
Montpelier has one enumeration district, ED 61600 (MontPellier_BrownesBay \Gaynors)

Montpelier had a population of 8 in 2001, making it the smallest town in all of Antigua and Barbuda.

2011 Census (Brownes Bay) 
Browne's Bay, Montpelier, and Gaynors were previously all one enumeration district (ED 61700), and it can be assumed that the three enumeration districts later became part of Brownes Bay, due to a very similar population.

In 2011, Brownes Bay had a population of 13. 

Brownes Bay has two census blocks, 661700027 and 661700031. Only one of these is populated.

References 

Saint Philip Parish, Antigua and Barbuda
Populated places in Antigua and Barbuda